Arignac is a commune in the Ariège department in the Occitanie region of south-western France.

The inhabitants of the commune are known as Arignacois or Arignacoises

Geography
Arignac is located 2 km north of Tarascon-sur-Ariège and some 11 km south of Foix. Access to the commune is by road D88 from Tarascon-sur-Ariège in the south passing through the village and continuing north-east to join National Highway N20 at Exit 14. The N20 passes through the south-east of the commune but the nearest exit is Exit 14 just east of the commune. The town covers about 10% of the commune with the rest mostly forest and hill country with a few farms in the south.

The Ariège river forms the south-eastern border of the commune and the Saurat flows south through the commune and the town to join the Ariège.

Neighbouring communes and villages

Administration

List of successive mayors

Demography
In 2017, the commune had 707 inhabitants.

See also
Communes of the Ariège department

References

External links
Arignac on Géoportail, National Geographic Institute (IGN) website 
Arignac on the 1750 Cassini Map

Communes of Ariège (department)